Those are the lists of performances of the Indonesian idol group, JKT48:

Asian

Television 
 CNA News (23 March 2013) on Channel NewsAsia
 Super Japan Popcorn Dreams with AKB48 (7 March 2014) on Discovery Channel

Indonesian

Television show or digital 
 JKT48 School – "Global TV" at 14:30, every Sunday, 15 April – 3 June 2012 (End)
 JKT48 Missions – "Trans 7" at 10:45, every Sunday, 23 June – 22 September 2013 (Hiatus)
 JKT48 Story – "RCTI" at 16:00, every Saturday, 31 August – 2 November 2013 (Hiatus)
 iClub48 – "NET." at 19:00 (1 November, 16:00), every Saturday – Sunday, 11 October 2014 – 14 March 2015
 Yokoso JKT48 – "ANTV" at 09:00, every Sunday, 14 December 2014 – 8 March 2015
  – "RTV" at 11:00, every Sunday, 13 December 2015 – 14 February 2016
 Tokyo Trip: Luxury or Ordinary – "RTV" at 14:00, every Saturday-Sunday, 17–18 September and 24-25, 2016
 [[Japantry Jepang Itu Asyik"]] – "JAKTV" at 19:30 – 20:30, every Sunday, 7 January – 26 February 2017
 JKT48 Ureshino Trip -Episode 1-Episode 2

 Web shows 
 JKT48 "Obrolan Luar Biasa"  – 24 March 2017 – 21 April 2017, every Friday

 Concerts 
 J-Pop Culture Festival 2012, Balai Kartini, Jakarta, 25 February 2012
 Konser Cinta Jakarta, RCTI, 22 June 2012
 Konser Terbaik 15th AMI Awards 2012, RCTI, 9 July 2012
 Mega Konser JKT48, RCTI, 17 July 2012
 Mahakarya RCTI 23 Tahun, RCTI, 8 August 2012
 Konser Super Dahsyat, RCTI, 1 September 2012
 Pesta Lamp10n, Global TV, 8 October 2012
 Konser 'AMA21NG' Ulang Tahun Ke-21 MNCTV, MNCTV, 20 October 2012
 11th Anniversary Concert Kota Wisata Batu (10 November 2012, Alun-alun Kota Batu, East Java)
 HUT Emas Seskoal 50 Anniversary'' (17 November 2012, Pantai Karnaval Ancol, Jakarta)

Television shows

International licensed television show

References 

Performances